Cork City (also known as Cork Borough) was a constituency represented in the Irish House of Commons until its abolition on 1 January 1801.

Boundaries and boundary changes
This constituency was the parliamentary borough of Cork in County Cork. It comprised the whole of the County of the City of Cork. Cork had the status of a county of itself, although it remained connected with County Cork for certain purposes.

A Topographical Directory of Ireland, published in 1837, describes the area covered. This seems to be the same area used, for the Parliament of Ireland constituency, in previous centuries.

The county of the city comprises a populous rural district of great beauty and fertility, watered by several small rivulets and intersected by the river Lee and its noble estuary: it is bounded on the north by the barony of Fermoy, on the east by that of Barrymore, on the south by Kerricurrihy, and on the west by Muskerry: it comprehends the parishes of St. Finbarr, Christ-Church or the Holy Trinity, St. Peter, St. Mary Shandon, St. Anne Shandon, St. Paul and St. Nicholas, all, except part of St. Finbarr's, within the city and suburbs, and those of Curricuppane, Carrigrohanemore, Kilcully, and Rathcoony, together with parts of the parishes of Killanully or Killingly, Carrigaline, Dunbullogue or Carrignavar, Ballinaboy, Inniskenny, Kilnaglory, White-church, and Templemichael, without those limits; and contains, according to the Ordnance survey, an area of 44,463 statute acres, of which, 2396 are occupied by the city and suburbs.

The Directory also has a passage on the representative history, which includes some information that applies to the pre-1801 constituency.

The right of election was vested in the freemen of the city, and in the 40s. freeholders and £50 leaseholders of the county of the city, of whom the freemen, in 1831, amounted in number to 2331, and the freeholders to 1545, making a total of 3876; but by the act of the 2nd of Wm. IV., cap. 88 (under which the city, from its distinguished importance, retains its privilege of returning two representatives to the Imperial parliament, and the limits of the franchise, comprising the entire county of the city, remain unaltered), the non-resident freemen, except within seven miles, have been disfranchised, and the privilege of voting at elections has been extended to the £10 householders, and the £20 and £10 leaseholders for the respective terms of 14 and 20 years. The number of voters registered up to Jan. 2nd, 1836, amounted to 4791, of whom 1065 were freemen; 2727 £10 householders; 105 £50, 152 £20, and 608 forty-shilling freeholders; 3 £50, 7 £20, and 2 £10 rent-chargers; and 1 £50, 26 £20, and 95 £10 leaseholders: the sheriffs are the returning officers.

Thus, before the Union, the electorate comprised the freemen of the city (including non-residents), and the Forty Shilling Freeholders of the county of the city. It returned two members to the Parliament of Ireland to 1800.

History
In the Patriot Parliament of 1689 summoned by James II, Cork City was represented with two members. Following the Act of Union 1800 the borough retained two parliamentary seats in the United Kingdom House of Commons.

Members of Parliament, 1264–1801

Notes

References

Bibliography

Johnston-Liik, E. M. (2002). History of the Irish Parliament, 1692–1800., Publisher: Ulster Historical Foundation (28 February 2002), 
Tim Cadogan and Jeremiah Falvey, A Biographical Dictionary of Cork, 2006, Four Courts Press 
T. W. Moody, F. X. Martin, F. J. Byrne, A New History of Ireland 1534–1691, Oxford University Press, 1978

Constituencies of the Parliament of Ireland (pre-1801)
Historic constituencies in County Cork
Politics of Cork (city)
1264 establishments in Ireland
1800 disestablishments in Ireland
Constituencies established in 1264
Constituencies disestablished in 1800